Dragged Under, (Stylized as DRAGGED UИDEʁ) is an American punk rock band from Seattle, Washington. Their debut album The World Is In Your Way, broke the Top 10 on the US Alternative iTunes charts, as well as #18 on the Billboard top alternative new artists and #45 top current hard music charts.

History
The band was formed in 2019 by vocalist Anthony Cappocchi and guitarists Ryan "Fluff" Bruce and Josh Wildhorn, following the breakup of their previous band Rest, Repose. Bassist Zesty Sams and drummer Kalun Wertz were later added to complete the band's lineup.

Dragged Under's first album The World Is In Your Way, which was released on January 17, 2020, featuring several songs that had originally been written by Rest, Repose, but were scrapped when that band broke up. While the album was initially released independently, the deluxe version was released through Mascot Records on November 15, 2020. Garnering 4.5 million streams in six months, it has since gone on to garner over 10 million streams on Spotify. To support the project, the band went on tour as a supporting act for The Used in the winter of 2020.

In May 2021, it was confirmed that the band would join Beartooth and Wage War on their fall 2021 tour. Shortly thereafter, the band announced that their first live EP, "We'll Do It Live," would be released on August 6, 2021, alongside the live version of "Hypochondria."

On August 12, 2021, the band released a new single, "Brainwash Broadcast," featuring Spencer Chamberlain of Underoath. On March 18, 2022, they announced the release of their second album Upright Animals for June 10, and released a music video for the album's second single, entitled "All Of Us".

Musical style and influences
Dragged Under describe their sound as "3 parts punk rock, 1 part metal/hardcore", citing influences such as Sum 41, Rise Against and The Offspring.

Members
Current
 Anthony Cappocchi - lead vocals (2019–present)
 Ryan "Fluff" Bruce - lead guitar, backing vocals (2019–present)
 Sean Rosario - rhythm guitar, backing vocals  (2020–present)
 Hans Hessburg - bass guitar, backing vocals (2019–present)
 Kalen Anderson - drums (2019–present)

Former
 Josh Wildhorn - rhythm guitar, backing vocals (2019–2020)
 Zesty Sams - bass guitar (2019)
 Kelun Wertz - drums (2019)

Discography

Albums

Studio albums

Live albums

Singles

Music videos

References

External links
 

Musical groups established in 2019
Musical groups from Seattle
Rock music groups from Washington (state)